George Trenchard is the name of:

George Trenchard (c. 1548–1630), MP for Bridport 1571, Dorchester 1572 and Dorset 1584
George Trenchard (died 1610) (c. 1575–1610), MP for Dorset in 1601
George Trenchard (MP for Poole) (c. 1684–1758), MP for Poole and Vice-Admiral of Dorset 
Sir George Trenchard Simon Davson, 4th Baronet (born 1964), of the Davson baronets, of Berbice in British Guiana
George Trenchard Goodenough (born 1743), a Fellow of the Royal Society of London